Cactus Forest is a census-designated place (CDP) in Pinal County, Arizona, United States. The population was 594 at the 2010 census.

Demographics 

Cactus Forest first appeared on the 2010 U.S. Census as a census-designated place (CDP).

As of the census of 2010, there were 594 people living in the CDP. The population density was 217.4 people per square mile. The racial makeup of the CDP was 87% White, 2% Black or African American, 4% Native American, <1% Asian, 5% from other races, and 3% from two or more races. 21% of the population were Hispanic or Latino of any race.

Notes

Census-designated places in Pinal County, Arizona